Pac-Man Fever may refer to:

 Pac-Man Fever (album), a 1981 album by Buckner & Garcia
 "Pac-Man Fever" (song), the 1981 title song from the album
 Pac-Man Fever (video game), a 2002 video game released for the Nintendo GameCube and Sony PlayStation 2
 "Pac-Man Fever", an episode of the US TV show Supernatural (season 8)